Almost Honest is Josh Kelley's second album, his last album on Hollywood Records. The album peaked at No. 114 on the Billboard 200 albums chart and No. 1 on the Top Heatseekers chart. "Only You" was released as a single. 

The title track appears on the Smallville: The Metropolis Mix soundtrack.

Track listing 

"You Are the Woman" is available in the US on the soundtrack to Herbie: Fully Loaded. The hidden track, "Heartache", also appears on the single for "Only You" and is sold separately from "Lydia" on the iTunes version.

Personnel
Spencer Albee – clavinet, Hammond organ, Wurlitzer
Clarence Allen – Hammond organ
Karl Berger – string arrangements 
Michael Bland – drums
Joe Firstman – piano, background vocals
Jason "Slim" Gambill – acoustic guitar, electric guitar
David Goodstein – drums
Jimmy Harry – slide guitar
Josh Kelley – acoustic guitar, electric guitar, percussion, lead vocals, background vocals 
Jacob Luttrell – Wurlitzer
The Matrix – programming
Ben Peeler – dulcimer, 12-string acoustic guitar, lap steel guitar
Robert Randolph – pedal steel guitar
Zac Roe – Chamberlin, Hammond organ, Wurlitzer
Matt Wallace – percussion 
Michael Ward – electric guitar 
Dave Yaden – banjo, keyboards, Hammond organ, sampled strings, background vocals

Charts

References

2005 albums
Josh Kelley albums
Hollywood Records albums